A89 or A-89 may refer to:
 A89 motorway (France)
 A89 road (Scotland)
 Dutch Defence, in the Encyclopaedia of Chess Openings
 Beauvechain Air Base, Advanced Landing Ground A89 during World War II